Gloria Casarez (December 13, 1971 – October 19, 2014) was an American civil rights leader and LGBT activist in Philadelphia. Casarez served as Philadelphia's first director of lesbian, gay, bisexual and transgender (LGBT) affairs. During her tenure as director, Philadelphia ranked as the number one city nationwide for LGBT equality. Casarez served as the executive director of Gay and Lesbian Latino AIDS Education Initiative (GALAEI) from 1999 to 2008.

Early life and education 
Gloria Casarez was born in Philadelphia and was raised Catholic. She grew up in the Kensington neighborhood of North Philadelphia attending Sheridan Elementary School and the Westmont section of Haddon Township, New Jersey, graduating from Haddon Township High School in 1989. Casarez came out as a lesbian at the age of 17.

Casarez attended West Chester University, where she was active in student government and political activism, earning a Bachelor of Arts in Criminal Justice and a Bachelor of Science in Political Science in 1993. She was President of the Latino Student Union and a representative to the Commission on the Status of Women, a network of students from state universities examining women's issues on campus. She was a William G. Rohrer Scholar.

Casarez completed an Executive Leadership Program at the University of Pennsylvania in 2005.

Career and activism 
Early work in the 1990s

From 1991 to 1996, Casarez was a founding member and community organizer for Empty the Shelters, a national student and youth led housing rights and economic justice organization. At the time, Empty the Shelters worked with existing Philadelphia movements:  the Kensington Welfare Rights Union and the Union of the Homeless. She developed and organized student engagement projects including the Summer of Social Action and Spring Break for a Change on campuses across the country.

From 1995 to 1998, Casarez was the Program Coordinator for the LGBT Center at the University of Pennsylvania, one of the oldest and most active centers of its kind in the United States. She developed innovative student-mentorship and programming for LGBT students of color, transgender and queer students on campus.

At the age of 27, Casarez became the executive director of the Gay and Lesbian Latino AIDS Education Initiative (GALAEI) in Philadelphia. Casarez led GALAEI from 1999 to 2008, tripling the organization's funding and developing nationally recognized programs serving men of color and transgender communities, including Philadelphia's first mobile HIV testing centers and the Trans-health information project – the first transgender health program in the city of Philadelphia.

Community boards

Casarez's work demonstrated a continuing interest in constituent led and community organizing efforts, starting with her early participation in social justice and political action movements.  An early advocate of harm reduction, Casarez co-chaired the board of directors for Prevention Point Philadelphia, Philadelphia's only syringe exchange, from 1999 to 2003.

She served as a longtime board member and leader of the Bread and Roses Community Fund, a public foundation that supports grassroots organizations working for racial and economic justice. Casarez served as an inaugural member of the Fund's Jonathan Lax Scholarship Committee from 2001 until her death in 2014. Bread & Roses Executive Director Casey Cook recalled Gloria as a fierce agent for real change. “Bread & Roses is just one among many communities enriched by Gloria’s leadership, courage, and strength,” said Casey. “Gloria will be remembered at Bread & Roses as an extraordinary organizer, a brilliant strategist, and a committed board member,” said Denise Brown, Bread & Roses board co-chair. “Gloria embodied the mission and intention of this organization with equal parts fierceness and humility.”

Casarez was a member of the LGBT Research Community Advisory Board of Public Health Management Corporation.  Casarez served as an ex-officio member for the Philadelphia LGBT Police Liaison Committee since 2008, working with community leaders and police officials to address LGBT public-safety issues, and taking part in LGBT-sensitivity training sessions for incoming Philadelphia police officers. Casarez was a founding board member of the LGBT Elder Initiative started in 2010.  Casarez served on the Philadelphia Convention and Visitors Bureau's PHL Diversity board.

She was also a founder of the Philadelphia DKYE March, Drag King, and the House of (Manolo) Blahnik Board of Directors.

In April 2013, Casarez engaged in Latino community organizing efforts to save La Milagrosa, Philadelphia's first Spanish-speaking church. Casarez's great-grandparents helped establish the church in the early 1900s.

Public sector position

Starting in the mid-1980s, Philadelphia mayors created various boards and commissions focused on sexual minority and LGBT communities.  In 1984, Mayor Wilson Goode created the first Philadelphia Commission on Sexual Minorities, appointing Darlene Garner to serve as executive director.  David Acosta, founder of GALAEI, served as the first Latino appointed to this commission. In 1990, Oscar Garcia-Vera was appointed co-chair of the Commission under Mayor Goode and through Mayor Ed Rendell's tenure. In 2001 Mayor John F. Street appointed a 15-member board to advise him on LGBT issues. This board was similar to Mayor Wilson Goode's commission. From 2001 to 2008, Michael Hinson Jr. served as the city's Assistant Managing Director under Mayor Street and as the liaison to the LGBT community.

In 2008, Gloria Casarez made history after being appointed by Mayor Michael A. Nutter to serve as Philadelphia's first Director of LGBT Affairs. Mayor Nutter established the Office of LGBT Affairs in 2008 by executive order.  Casarez's appointment marked the first time that a salaried position was established to serve the LGBT community directly in the Mayor's Office and located within Philadelphia City Hall. At the press conference in Philadelphia City Hall announcing Casarez's appointment, she stated “I pledge to represent the community with authenticity, integrity and respect.”

Casarez led the efforts of the Mayor's Office of LGBT Affairs and the Mayor's advisory board on LGBT Affairs from 2008 to 2014. The Director of LGBT Affairs developed priorities for the city of Philadelphia on issues including public safety, education, economic development, health and city services and civil rights. The Office of LGBT Affairs worked to foster equitable working and living conditions for lesbian, gay, bisexual, transgender, and queer (LGBTQ) people and to advocate for LGBTQ issues in all areas of City government.  In 2012, Philadelphia was ranked number two nationwide for LGBT equality in the first edition of the Human Rights Campaign Municipal Equality Index. Philadelphia was the highest scoring city in the nation (of the ten largest cities) and the highest scoring city without statewide legal protections for LGBT people. 

The Office of LGBT Affairs became a permanent part of the city's charter in 2015, after being ratified by Philadelphia voters in the November general election.  Mayor Michael Nutter stated "When I became mayor, I was proud to establish the Mayor's Office of Lesbian, Gay, Bisexual and Transgender (LGBT) Affairs and appoint the late Gloria Casarez as its first director" Nutter said.  "Making this office permanent under the City of Philadelphia charter ensures that the LGBT community will continue to be represented in city government, and that the good work done to advance LGBT issues over the last seven years will carry on well into the future."  
During Casarez's tenure, Philadelphia adopted the broadest LGBT rights protections in the nation, when Mayor Nutter signed Bill No. 130224 into law. Casarez served as Director of LGBT Affairs until her death in October 2014.

Honors and awards
Out Magazine named Casarez one of the "100 Most Influential Leaders of the New Millennium" in 1999. She received the Philadelphia Out Proud Award and was the 2001 Philadelphia LGBT Pride Grand Marshal.

Casarez was honored by the National Association for the Advancement of Colored People (NAACP) with the Annual Community Service Award In recognition of her social and political justice activism.

Casarez's work supporting LGBT ballroom communities was recognized with her receiving the Humanitarian Award at the House of Prestige's 20th Anniversary Renaissance Ball and the Community Service Award at the House of Blahnik Ball. She received the Kiyoshi Kuromiya Award for Justice from Philadelphia FIGHT, and the Cheryl Ingram Advocate for Justice Award from the Philadelphia Bar Association. Casarez received the Hero Award from the Delaware Valley Legacy Fund; past honorees include gay rights pioneer Barbara Gittings, philanthropist Mel Heifetz, and Pennsylvania Governor Ed Rendell. She was honored with the David Acosta Revolutionary Leader Award in 2013 by the Gay and Lesbian Latino AIDS Education Initiative (GALAEI).

Local and national news outlets recognized Casarez's contributions. Go Magazine named her "100 Women We Love" and a "Women at the Helm." Philadelphia Magazine included her in a "Who's Who of Philly's Gay Community." Philly Gay Calendar selected Casarez the 2009 "Person of the Year" and she received the Philadelphia Leadership Award from Women's eNews.

Metropolitan Community Church presented Casarez with the Patron of Humanity Award at their 40th Anniversary Convocation Service held in Philadelphia. Dignity USA honored Casarez with a Community Service Award in 2010

Casarez threw out the ceremonial first pitch at Citizens Bank Park in Philadelphia before a Philadelphia Phillies game against the Houston Astros on August 23, 2010.

West Chester University inducted Casarez into their Legacy of Leadership in 2012. Casarez was named the Philadelphia Pride Grand Marshal in 2001 and 2014.

In 2014, Casarez received the Keystone Award from the Pennsylvania Youth Action Conference.  She told the crowd of student leaders attending the conference at the University of Pennsylvania the following:  "I want to encourage you to continue to fight, continue to push, and make your communities the best they can be...Our mandate, really, is that everyone needs to be at the table. I come out of community organizing, and you don’t win the righteous wins unless you have all the voices at the table. So in anything that we’re doing, it’s really important to have many voices at the table, the people who are with you, the people who aren’t with you yet, and the people who are going to help you get where you need to go. So that is something I am encouraging you to do that as well; you want to have the naysayers as well as the yes people at your table. You need everybody...

At the end of the day, and I’ve said this before, and I’ll say it again, at the end of the day, a big part of what we do is about love. When I first started my work in activism and organizing I used to say, “I’m angry, I’m fired up,” and I was, but I was also approaching this work from a standpoint of love." Gloria Casarez,  2014

Personal life 
Marriage

Gloria Casarez was an LGBT marriage equality advocate and activist. She legally married her long-time partner, Tricia Dressel, on August 12, 2011, in a private civil ceremony at the Manhattan Marriage Bureau, three weeks after New York State passed the Marriage Equality Act. City of Philadelphia Mayor Michael Nutter performed his first ever same-sex commitment ceremony for the couple at their ten-year anniversary party held on September 3, 2011, at the Fleisher Art Memorial in Philadelphia. Speaking to a reporter from The Philadelphia Gay News (PGN), Casarez said "When we purchased our home together, we thought this is a new level, we’re committing to this 30-year mortgage together. And in 10 years, we’ve navigated a lot of hard stuff together so when we decided to get married, I was thinking it was this action, this thing we did, but it's more than that,” she said. “We had been joking originally, ‘Let’s get gay married,’ but this isn't ‘gay marriage,’ this is marriage. This is significant."

On May 20, 2014 a federal judge struck down Pennsylvania’s former ban on marriage for same-sex couples (Whitewood v Wolf) on the grounds it unconstitutionally discriminated against lesbians and gay men. The order directed the commonwealth of Pennsylvania to allow same-sex couples to marry and to legally recognize valid out-of-state marriages. The order on May 20, 2014 legally recognized Casarez's 2011 legally valid New York state marriage to Dressel in their home city and state of Philadelphia, Pennsylvania three months before Casarez's death.

Health and death

Casarez was diagnosed with metastatic inflammatory breast cancer in March 2009. The Philadelphia Gay News published excerpts of Casarez's "The Word: A breast-cancer blog," chronicling her daily experiences as a woman living and working with cancer. Susan G. Komen Breast Cancer Foundation honored Casarez with their 2012 Breast Survivor Award. Philadelphia Mayor Michael A. Nutter said the following of Casarez, “she never wanted the focus to be on her; she was always deflecting or deferring to others. She would really only talk about how she felt if you asked her. She wasn’t walking around talking about herself or her health issues. I would see her in the hallway and say, ‘Hey, how are you doing?’ and she'd just say, ‘Coming along, getting better.’ And I know it wasn't always necessarily true. But she was a fighter."

After living with metastatic breast cancer for over five years, Casarez died on October 19, 2014 at the Hospital of the University of Pennsylvania. "She was a fighter to the end," her wife said. Two weeks before her death, Casarez led the LGBT flag raising ceremony at City Hall for LGBT History Month.  Casarez started the tradition of raising the LGBT rainbow flag in 2010, the first time the flag was raised at a municipal building in Philadelphia.

Memorial

On October 20, 2014, Philadelphia ordered the LGBT rainbow flag at City Hall to half mast in honor of Casarez's passing. Casarez's funeral was held at Arch Street Methodist Church led by Pastor Robin Hynicka. The Philadelphia Gay Tourism Caucus created the “Show Your True Colors for Gloria” campaign, calling on the community and businesses to “display rainbow flags in windows of stores, bars, restaurants, offices, shops and homes" across Philadelphia in memory of Casarez.

Philadelphia FIGHT honored Casarez with the Kiyoshi Kuromiya award for HIV/AIDS activism in 2011 in recognition of her many years of activism on behalf of disenfranchised Latinx LGBTQ youth. Following her death, FIGHT stated "Gloria wasn’t just a policymaker and activist. She was a kind, generous, and fun person.  She bravely fought her cancer for many years and even as a cancer patient she remained an activist, often refusing to cover her head, or cover over her diagnosis. Everybody loved Gloria, and we will all miss her very much." Civil rights activist and community organizer Amber Hikes said of Casarez "Her light was so bright, it lit the way for all of us. She used her energy to build up those around her and support our dreams and our talents. Gloria guided this community in ways most of us do not know or even understand. She was a leader for LGBTQ people in this city for sure but to this queer brown girl, she was a giant, a living legend, proof that there was a place for queer people of color in this community.”

Legacy 
Posthumous awards

The Diabolique Foundation awarded Gloria Casarez with the Lifetime Service Award at the Diabolique Ball in November 2014. The I Am Human Campaign of the BEBASHI organization awarded Casarez with the Governmental Liaison Award in December 2014. The Delaware Valley Legacy Fund awarded Casarez with the Lifetime Legacy Award in 2015. The Philadelphia Commission on Human Relations (PCHR) awarded Casarez with the Sadie T.M. Alexander Leadership Award in 2015.

In April 2019, Casarez was featured in an exhibit sponsored by Pennsylvania First Lady Frances Wolf at the Governor's mansion that highlighted 32 Pennsylvania women who were “Game Changers.” The Philadelphia women featured alongside Casarez included actress and princess Grace Kelly, opera singer Marian Anderson, civil rights activist Sadie T.M. Alexander and LGBT rights activist Barbara Gittings. The exhibit is permanently housed at the State Museum of Pennsylvania.

In 2021, the President's Commission on the Status of Women named Casarez one of the 150 most influential women of West Chester University in celebration of the 150th Anniversary of the university.

Gloria Casarez Way

Philadelphia City Council passed a resolution in 2015 naming the 200 block of South 12th Street in Center City Philadelphia "Gloria Casarez Way."  This street also included artist Michelle Angela Ortiz's mural titled "A Tribute to Gloria Casarez."

Gloria Casarez Residence
Project HOME's Gloria Casarez Residence, named in her honor, was opened on May 14, 2019. The residence provides LGBTQ-friendly affordable homes for young adults who are homeless, have experienced homelessness or are at risk of homelessness, including those aging out of foster care. This is the first permanent supportive housing of this kind in Pennsylvania and among the first in the nation.

State historical Marker

A state historical marker commemorating Gloria Casarez was installed at Philadelphia's City Hall on October 8, 2021. During the ceremony, the rainbow flag was raised in honor of National LGBTQ History Month in October, a tradition started by Casarez in 2010. The ceremony also took place during Breast Cancer Awareness Month and National Hispanic Heritage Month.  The historical marker was approved in 2020 by the Pennsylvania Historical and Museum Commission but its installation was delayed due to the COVID-19 pandemic. Taking its place among several other LGBTQ-related state markers already in Philadelphia, the historical marker for Casarez made national news since it was the first historical marker in the state of Pennsylvania honoring a person of Latin or Hispanic descent.

John Anderies, Director for the John J. Wilcox Archives at the William Way LGBT Community Center in Philadelphia submitted the nomination for Gloria Casarez. Letters of support for the historical marker included those by public historian Susan Ferentinos, author of the book: Interpreting LGBT History at Museums and Historic Sites; executive director of the Pennsylvania Commission on LGBTQ Affairs, Rafael Álvarez Febo; and Philadelphia Mayor Jim Kenney. "Casarez stands as a role model for younger activists," wrote Ferentinos in her letter, "particularly those who are LGBTQ and/or Latinx. And these are populations who are sadly lacking in role models from history, due to the erasure of their predecessors from the national historical narrative. Preserving the memory of Gloria Casarez is a step toward rectifying this situation."

At the historical marker unveiling ceremony at Philadelphia City Hall, social worker Ninoshka Montas, who attended Casarez's alma mater West Chester University, said “Gloria’s groundbreaking work sparks a fire inside of me to lead by example and follow in her footprints to advocate for my community. Her work nurtures the Latina dreamer from Philadelphia that lives inside of me, and I hope it also sparks a fire in each of you. Gloria is an example of what happens when you combine hard work, dedication, passion, and love.”

Gloria Casarez Elementary School

In June 2022 administrators from the Philip H. Sheridan Elementary announced that parents, faculty, students and community members voted to change the name of their school to the Gloria Casarez Elementary School. Philip H. Sheridan Elementary School was built in 1899-1900 named after the Union Civil War general, most well known for overseeing brutal campaigns against Native Americans. “We were looking to find a name that represented our school and the goal of inclusion,” said Sheridan's assistant principal Julio Nunez. “It was 46% of the vote in favor of her. There were three other candidates on the ballot. The community voted, selected that name. The majority of the students, by the way, voted and the majority of them selected her [Casarez]. And we’re very proud that now we stand with her for inclusion as well, as we move forward,” Nunez said. Gloria Casarez attended Sheridan Elementary School.

Arts and Culture

Philadelphia-based artists created murals throughout the street of Philadelphia in honor of Casarez's legacy. On October 11, 2015, Philadelphia's Outfest celebration unveiled a two-story mural titled "A Tribute to Gloria Casarez" by artists Michelle Angela Ortiz and Briana Dawkins on the 12th street facing wall of the 12th Street Gym.

On December 13, 2016, Black trans poet, musician, and trans-rights activist Christian Lovehall aka "WORDZ The Poet Emcee" dedicated a song in memory of Casarez titled "See Ya Later." The song was featured on iTunes and included excerpts from a speech Casarez delivered at the 2014 Philadelphia DYKE March.

In March 2020 as part of the #SisterlyLove Project, artist Hope Hummingbird created a porcelain portrait of Casarez as part of a street art exhibition for Women's History Month.

During negotiations and community organizing to preserve Ortiz's mural of Casarez before demolition of the 12th Street Gym, the mural was abruptly white-washed without notice to the artists or community on December 23, 2020, by Midwood Development and Investment. The removal of the mural created national news after artist Michelle Angela Ortiz arrived at sunset to project a mirror image of the mural onto the newly white-washed wall, along with the message, "YOU CAN'T ERASE OUR HISTORY." Midwood Development and Investment later issued a public apology and statement to the community.

On October 8, 2021, Casarez was featured on a mural at Giovanni's Room Bookstore titled "Finding our Happy" created by Philly-based LGBTQ+ artists, Nilé Livingston, Nicole Nikolich, Marisa Velázquez-Rivas, and writer and curator, Conrad Benner.

In January 2021, queer street artist Tish Urquhart wheat pasted a 4-by-4-foot image of Casarez at the Franklin Club at 205 S. Camac St. steps away from the location of Michelle Angela Ortiz's original mural of Gloria Casarez. Urquhart's tribute was also removed less than two days after it was placed.

Philadelphia artist Alloyius Mcilwaine painted a live portrait of Casarez at the first Haddon Township LGBT Pride festival held in June 2021.  The portrait will be permanently housed at Haddon Township High School, where Casarez was an alumna.

Cuban/Egyptian street artist, muralist, and educator Symone Salib created a mural honoring Casarez titled "My Existence is Resistance" in collaboration with the Philadelphia Latino Film Festival, Afro Taino Productions, and Philadelphia Mural Arts. Located in Norris Square, Philadelphia, the mural was unveiled in September 2021.

During the June 2022 Philadelphia Pride March, organizers from the PHL Pride Collective and Philly Dyke March erected a large replica of Michelle Angela Ortiz's mural honoring Gloria Casarez at the original mural site of 12th and Locust.  Casarez was a founding member of the Philly Dyke March and LGBT community pioneer.

See also 
Civil Rights Leaders 
LGBT Rights Activists 
Philadelphia Gay News
LGBT social movements
Michael Nutter

References

External links 

 Gloria Casarez papers, 1987-2015, held by John J. Wilcox, Jr. LGBT Archives, William Way LGBT Community Center

1971 births
2014 deaths
LGBT people from New Jersey
LGBT people from Pennsylvania
Deaths from cancer in Pennsylvania
People from Haddon Township, New Jersey
Political lesbians
Activists from New Jersey
Activists from Philadelphia
West Chester University alumni